Coimbatore–Rameswaram express (Train Nos 16617/16618) is an express weekly train run by Indian Railways between Coimbatore city Junction and Rameswaram. The train made its inaugural run on 17 September 2013. 

This train is mainly introduce to compensate the Coimbatore Rameswaram daily Meter Gauge express via Madurai, Pollachi since this train has been discontinued due to gauge conversion of dindigul-pollachi line. Though gauge conversion completed, it never restored till date (but ran as a limited run festival special train after gauge conversion for a period of 1 month). So this train(16617/16618) will run to compensate the Meter Gauge express.

Service and schedule

Route and stations
This train passes through 14 intermediate stations including Erode, Karur, Tiruchirappalli, Pudukkottai,  Karaikkudi, Devakottai Road, Sivaganga and Manamadurai. Previously this train also had stoppages at Chettinad and Kodumudi.

Train No 16618 Coimbatore Rameswaram Express

 Coimbatore Junction
 Tiruppur
 Erode Junction
 Karur Junction
 Tiruchirappalli Junction
 Pudukkottai
 Karaikkudi Junction
 Devakottai Road
 Manamadurai Junction
 Paramakudi
 Ramanathapuram
 Mandapam
 Rameswaram.
 
Train No 16617 Rameswaram Coimbatore Express

(* - Additional Stoppages when compared with 16618)
 Rameswaram
Mandapam
Ramanathapuram
Paramakudi
Manamadurai Junction
Sivaganga*
Devakottai Road
Karaikkudi Junction
Pudukkottai
Tiruchirappalli Junction
Karur Junction
Erode Junction
Tiruppur 
Coimbatore North Junction*
Coimbatore Junction

Rake composition
This train shares its rake with Coimbatore Rajkot Express
 1 AC II tier
 3 AC III tier
 14 sleeper coaches
 2 general
 2 second-class luggage/parcel van

References

External links
 16618 Time Table & Live Running Status
 16617 Time Table & Live Running Status

Rail transport in Tamil Nadu
Express trains in India
Transport in Coimbatore
Railway services introduced in 2013
Transport in Rameswaram